Evan Brown (born May 1, 1987 in Raleigh, North Carolina) is an American retired soccer player.

Career

High school
Brown attended Millbrook High School, where he was a three-year letter winner as well as a three time academy all conference player. He was named All-VI Conference twice and earned all-region player in his senior year. He played club soccer for Capital Area Soccer League (CASL) for head coach Bruce Talbot, with whom he captured four state championships, a regional championship and a national finals berth, as well as a pair of Disney Soccer Showcase Titles.

Brown played college soccer at Wake Forest University from 2005 to 2008, finishing his career ranked sixth in games played with 89.

During his college years Brown also played for Cary RailHawks U23s in the USL Premier Development League.

Professional
Brown was drafted in the second round (16th overall) of the 2009 MLS SuperDraft by Seattle Sounders FC. Coach Sigi Schmid stated, "Evan has tremendous endurance, and likes to get forward.". He made his professional debut on April 29, 2009, in a U.S. Open Cup match against Real Salt Lake. Brown was waived by Seattle in November, 2009, having never played an MLS game for the team.

Brown played the amateur team CASL Elite in the Lamar Hunt U.S. Open Cup in 2010; his team won their regional qualification group (which also featured NPSL teams FC Tulsa and Atlanta FC) before falling 4-2 to USL Second Division pro side Charleston Battery in the first round of tournament proper.

Honors

Wake Forest University
NCAA Men's Division I Soccer Championship (1): 2007

Seattle Sounders FC
Lamar Hunt U.S. Open Cup (1): 2009

References

1987 births
Living people
American soccer players
Association football defenders
Cary Clarets players
Seattle Sounders FC draft picks
Seattle Sounders FC players
Soccer players from Raleigh, North Carolina
USL League Two players
Wake Forest Demon Deacons men's soccer players
Soccer players from North Carolina